Thomas, Thomas is a 2010 German short mockumentary film, directed by German film director Corinna Liedtke. The film participated in several German and European film festivals and won a few prizes.

Plot
Wolfgang Weber is a bit unworldly archivist of the city of Castrop-Rauxel. He makes an astonishing discovery while receiving treatment at Thomas Vallomtharayil's Ayurvedic clinic. 150 years earlier, another Thomas was at work where the clinic stands today: the Irish mining pioneer and Ruhr legend Thomas Mulvany. This film accompanies the archivist in a documentary style through his research into the astounding parallels between the lives of the two Thomas’, which leads Wolfgang Weber to a striking conclusion: Thomas Vallomtharayil is the reincarnation of Thomas Mulvany.

Awards 
2010: Special mention at the 27th Kassel Documentary Film and Video Festival in Kassel, Germany
2011: Team Award at the German film festival 24th Stuttgarter Filmwinter

Background 
At first Thomas, Thomas was only an episode of the German TV movie Zeche is nich – Sieben Blicke auf das Ruhrgebiet 2010, which was produced in the context of Ruhr.2010. The film tells the fictional and non-fictional stories of young filmmakers of their home, the Ruhr Area. Later Thomas, Thomas and other episodes of this TV movie were released as self-contained films.

Miscellaneous 
In Wolfgang Weber - Ein neuer Fall (Wolfgang Weber - A new case) the archivist examines the market place of Castrop-Rauxel, where curiously a lot of accidents happen.
The teaser Wolfgang Weber - Neue Fälle aus Castrop-Rauxel (Wolfgang Weber - New Cases from Castrop-Rauxel) shows new cases of Wolfgang Weber.

References

External links 
 
Thomas, Thomas on Vimeo (with English subtitles

2010 films
2010s German-language films
2010 short films
German comedy short films
2010 comedy films
2010s German films